Tibbles and Tibble may refer to:
Tibbles, a pet cat which is alleged to have wiped out Lyall's wren on Stephens Island in New Zealand
tibble, an alternative to a dataframe or datatable in the tidyverse in the R programming language

People
Thomas Henry Tibbles (1840–1928), American abolitionist, author, journalist, Indians' rights activist, and politician
Susette LaFlesche Tibbles (1854–1903), Native American lecturer, writer, and artist from the Omaha tribe in Nebraska
George Tibbles (1913–1987), American screenwriter and composer
Stephen Andrew Tibble (1953–1975), London Metropolitan Police officer who was shot and killed by Liam Quinn, a member of the IRA
Geoffrey Arthur Tibble (1909–1952), English artist
Tayi Tibble (born 1995), New Zealand poet

Characters
 The Tibble twins, brothers Timmy Tommy Tibble, characters from the TV show Arthur